Nearly ten percent of the population of Gabon practice Islam, according to a 2012 estimate. Most follow Sunni Islam. 80 to 90 percent of the Muslims are foreigners.

Islamic, Catholic and Protestant denominations operate primary and secondary schools in Gabon. These schools are required to register with the Ministry of Education, which is charged with ensuring that these religious schools meet the same standards required for public schools. The government does not contribute funds to private schools, whether religious or secular.

The Gabonese Government celebrates some Christian and Muslim holy days as national holidays. These include Easter Sunday and Monday, Ascension Day, Assumption Day, All Saints' Day, Christmas, Eid al-Kebir, and Eid al-Fitr.

The government television stations accorded free transmission time to the Catholic Church, some Protestant congregations, and Islamic mosques. Some Protestant denominations alleged that the government television station does not accord free airtime to minority religious groups. Protestants have alleged in the past that the armed forces favor Catholics and Muslims in hiring and promotion.

Gabon's presidency has been held by Muslims since 1973. Political strongman Omar Bongo converted to Islam in 1973 and changed his name from Albert-Bernard Bongo to its current form. Following Omar Bongo's death, his son Ali Bongo Ondimba, also a Muslim, ascended to the presidency. Gabon is a member of the Organisation of Islamic Cooperation, having joined under Omar Bongo's leadership in 1974.

In 2004 a first national conference for the Muslims of Gabon was held in the capital city of the country, Libreville, on the theme ‘United for the sake of a flourishing and tolerant Islam’. During the conference, heads of some 34 Islamic societies of Gabon signed an agreement for undertaking coordinated Islamic works on the sidelines of the event.

Notable Muslims
Ali Bongo Ondimba
Edith Lucie Bongo
Omar Bongo

See also
 Religion in Gabon

References